Lucien Raimbourg (1903–1973) was a French film, stage and television actor. He appeared in the original performance of Samuel Beckett's Waiting for Godot.

Selected filmography

 L'affaire est dans le sac (1932) - Le client myope au chapeau de curé (as Raimbourg)
 Ciboulette (1933)
 Tout chante autour de moi (1954)
 Naughty Girl (1956)
 He Who Must Die (1957)
 Serenade of Texas (1958)
 Du rififi chez les femmes (1959)
 The Verdict (1959)
 The Indestructible (1959)
 Austerlitz (1960)
 Lovers on a Tightrope (1960)
 Dynamite Jack (1961)
 Spotlight on a Murderer (1961)
 Cartouche (1962)
 Highway Pickup (1963)
 A Question of Honour (1965)
 An Idiot in Paris (1967)
 The Scarlet Lady (1969)
 Peace in the Fields (1970)
 The Devil's Nightmare (1971)

References

Bibliography 
 Deirdre Bair. Samuel Beckett: A Biography. Simon and Schuster, 1990.

External links 
 

1903 births
1973 deaths
French male film actors
French male stage actors
French male television actors